This is a list of soul foods and dishes. Soul food is a style of cuisine that is associated with African Americans in the Southern United States It uses a variety of ingredients and cooking styles, many of which came from Europe, and some that came from Africa and were brought over by enslaved Africans. Some are indigenous to the Americas as well, borrowed from Native American cuisine.


Meat dishes 
Some meat soul foods and dishes include:

Vegetables and legumes 
Beans, greens and other vegetables are often cooked with ham or pork parts to add flavor.

Breads and grains

Desserts

See also
 List of American foods
 List of foods of the Southern United States
 Louisiana Creole cuisine
 List of American desserts

References

Bibliography
 Ferguson, Sheila (1993). Soul Food: Classic Cuisine from the Deep South. Grove Press.

Further reading
 Woods, Sylvia (1992). Sylvia's Soul Food. HarperCollins. 

Soul food

List